Hanspeter Knobel (born 24 September 1963) is a Swiss former biathlete. He competed in the men's 20 km individual event at the 1994 Winter Olympics.

References

External links
 

1963 births
Living people
Swiss male biathletes
Olympic biathletes of Switzerland
Biathletes at the 1994 Winter Olympics
Sportspeople from the canton of Schwyz